Direkt is a Swedish financial news agency delivering financial news to mainly Swedish and Danish consumers. Direkt made a financial loss for each of the years 2005–2009, and in 2009 management announced aspirations for a profitable 2010.

Ownership
Direkt was acquired from Bisnode in 2008. In 2011 Direkt was sold to Danish financial news agency RB-Børsen

References

Financial news agencies
News agencies based in Sweden